Samuel Sweet Canal Store is a historic commercial building located at 65 Bridge Street in Amsterdam, Montgomery County, New York.  It was built c.1847 to service barges on the Erie Canal, as both a store and a forwarding warehouse for goods shipped across the Mohawk River.

It is a three-story, rectangular building measuring approximately 30 feet by 70 feet built of rough cut, pale grey limestone and has a shallow pitched gable roof.

It was added to the National Register of Historic Places in 1989.

References

Commercial buildings on the National Register of Historic Places in New York (state)
Commercial buildings completed in 1847
Buildings and structures in Montgomery County, New York
1847 establishments in New York (state)
National Register of Historic Places in Montgomery County, New York